Reep may refer to:

Charles Reep, English soccer analyst and statistician
Jon Reep, American comedian and actor
Reep Daggle, DC Comics character
The Review of Environmental Economics and Policy (REEP), a peer-reviewed journal of environmental economics